Kosova is a village in Foča municipality, in the Republika Srpska, Bosnia and Herzegovina.

References

Cities and towns in Republika Srpska